Lawas is a federal constituency in Limbang Division (Lawas District), Sarawak, Malaysia, that has been represented in the Dewan Rakyat since 2008.

The federal constituency was created in the 2005 redistribution and is mandated to return a single member to the Dewan Rakyat under the first past the post voting system.

Demographics 
第15届全国大选-东方日报-2022

History

Polling districts 
According to the Official Gazette dated 31 October 2022, the Lawas constituency has a total of 42 polling districts.

Representation history

State constituency

Current state assembly members

Local governments

Election results

References

Sarawak federal constituencies